Dypsis nossibensis is a species of flowering plant in the family Arecaceae. It is found only in the Lokobe Forest in north-west Madagascar and is threatened by habitat loss.  Fewer than 25 trees have been counted.

References

nossibensis
Endemic flora of Madagascar
Critically endangered plants
Taxa named by Odoardo Beccari
Taxonomy articles created by Polbot